The 2002–03 NBA season was the 33rd season for the Portland Trail Blazers in the National Basketball Association. During the off-season, the Blazers acquired Antonio Daniels from the San Antonio Spurs, and signed free agent Jeff McInnis. Former Blazers center Arvydas Sabonis came out of his retirement, and returned to play for the team after a one-year absence. The Blazers got off to a mediocre 10–11 start, but then posted an 8-game winning streak in December, and held a 32–16 record at the All-Star break. However, they would slow down playing .500 basketball for the remainder of the season, finishing third in the Pacific Division with a solid 50–32 record, and making the playoffs for the 21st consecutive year and 26th year of the last 27.

Rasheed Wallace averaged 18.1 points and 7.4 rebounds per game, while Bonzi Wells averaged 15.2 points, 5.3 rebounds and 1.6 steals per game, and Derek Anderson provided the team with 13.9 points per game. In addition, Scottie Pippen contributed 10.8 points and 1.6 steals per game, and Dale Davis contributed 7.4 points and 7.2 rebounds per game. Off the bench, Ruben Patterson provided with 8.3 points per game, while second-year forward Zach Randolph averaged 8.4 points and 4.5 rebounds per game, and Damon Stoudamire played half of the season off the bench, averaging 6.9 points and 3.5 assists per game.

In the playoffs, the 6th-seeded Blazers battled the Dallas Mavericks in the Western Conference First Round, and fell four games to three. (The NBA had changed all playoff series to be best-of-seven; previously first-round series had been best-of-five). The Blazers remain the last team to force a Game 7 after trailing 3-0 in a best-of-seven series, after the 1950-51 Knicks in the NBA Finals and the 1993-94 Nuggets in the Western Conference Semi-finals, though no team has come back to win an NBA playoff series after trailing 3-0.

The Blazers' 107–95 Game 7 loss to the Mavericks in Dallas would be the venerable franchise's last playoff game for six years, as the historic postseason streak ended in 2003–04 with a mediocre 41–41 record; two seasons followed in which they failed to win even 30 games. Following the season, Pippen re-signed as a free agent with his former team, the Chicago Bulls, while Daniels signed with the Seattle SuperSonics, and Sabonis retired for the second time.

For the season, the Blazers changed their primary logo, and slightly changed their uniforms. The primary logo only lasted for just one season, while the home jerseys lasted until 2017, and the road jerseys remained in use until 2006, where they replaced the team name "Blazers" with the city name "Portland".

Draft picks

Roster

Regular season

Season standings

z - clinched division title
y - clinched division title
x - clinched playoff spot

Record vs. opponents

Game log

Playoffs

|- align="center" bgcolor="#ffcccc"
| 1
| April 19
| @ Dallas
| L 86–96
| Rasheed Wallace (26)
| Davis, Wells (10)
| Scottie Pippen (5)
| American Airlines Center20,336
| 0–1
|- align="center" bgcolor="#ffcccc"
| 2
| April 23
| @ Dallas
| L 99–103
| Bonzi Wells (45)
| Dale Davis (15)
| Damon Stoudamire (5)
| American Airlines Center20,356
| 0–2
|- align="center" bgcolor="#ffcccc"
| 3
| April 25
| Dallas
| L 103–115
| Ruben Patterson (19)
| Zach Randolph (10)
| Bonzi Wells (6)
| Rose Garden19,980
| 0–3
|- align="center" bgcolor="#ccffcc"
| 4
| April 27
| Dallas
| W 98–79
| Zach Randolph (25)
| Zach Randolph (15)
| Damon Stoudamire (11)
| Rose Garden19,980
| 1–3
|- align="center" bgcolor="#ccffcc"
| 5
| April 30
| @ Dallas
| W 103–99
| Zach Randolph (22)
| Zach Randolph (9)
| Bonzi Wells (7)
| American Airlines Center20,438
| 2–3
|- align="center" bgcolor="#ccffcc"
| 6
| May 2
| Dallas
| W 125–103
| Zach Randolph (21)
| Zach Randolph (10)
| McInnis, Wallace (6)
| Rose Garden20,602
| 3–3
|- align="center" bgcolor="#ffcccc"
| 7
| May 4
| @ Dallas
| L 95–107
| Stoudamire, Wallace (17)
| Zach Randolph (10)
| Damon Stoudamire (9)
| American Airlines Center20,281
| 3–4
|-

Player statistics

Season

Playoffs

Transactions

Overview

Player Transactions Citation:

References

Portland Trail Blazers seasons
Portland Trail Blazers 2002
Port
Port
Port
Portland Trail Blazers